Tom Burditt (born August 18, 1956) is an American politician and a Republican member of the Vermont House of Representatives representing District 2 of Rutland County. He is a former selectmen for the town of West Rutland.

References

External links
 Ballotpedia
 Vote Smart

Living people
1956 births
People from West Rutland, Vermont
21st-century American politicians
Republican Party members of the Vermont House of Representatives